AK Mosharraf Hossain Akand is a Awami League politician and the former Member of Parliament of Mymensingh-14.

Career
Akand was elected to parliament from Mymensingh-14 as an Awami League candidate in 1973.

References

1st Jatiya Sangsad members
Awami League politicians
Living people
Year of birth missing (living people)